Niehuisia is a monotypic genus of beetles in the family Buprestidae, the jewel beetles. The sole species is Niehuisia maghrebica, which was first described in 1995.

References

Monotypic Buprestidae genera